The Bosnian Footballer of the Year, since 2008 renamed to  Idol Nacije (English translation: The Idol of the nation), is an annual award given to the best Bosnian football player of the year, as well as recognising and awarding other sports men and women, coaches and game officials in the country. The event was held in 2001 under the Bosnian banner for the first time, with Sergej Barbarez winning the most prestigious award for best player of the year, and again in 2003.

From 2008 to 2013, the awards was organized by sports news/media website SportSport.ba and broadcast on NTV Hayat and was expanded to include many other award categories. Edin Džeko won three Idol Nacije awards in a row.  Vedad Ibišević and Asmir Begović were the only other Idol of the nation winners. For the 2010 awards, it was decided that former player Muhamed Konjić would nominate 10 players for the main award of player of the year. In 2008 Sergej Barbarez had this honor, while Mehmed Baždarević received the task in 2009.

The show changed format from 2011. It was announced that the ceremony for 2011 would be held before the end of June, and that all future events will take place during the summer, rather than the winter period. The awards will therefore be given for performances during the last season, rather than for the last calendar year. Since the 2014–15 season, the awards are organized and run by NFSBiH.

List of winners
During the days of Yugoslavia, the award was run collectively on the entire former Yugoslavia territory by newspaper Večernji list from 1972 until the breakup of SFRY. Some of the past winners from the Socialist Republic of Bosnia and Herzegovina in those times include:

Dušan Bajević (1972,  Velež), 
Enver Marić (1973,  Velež), 
Josip Katalinski (1974,  Željezničar), 
Safet Sušić (1979,  Sarajevo), 
Blaž Slišković (1985,  Hajduk Split) 
Semir Tuce (1986,  Velež).

Past winners from the modern-day state of Bosnia and Herzegovina include:

Idol Nacije

Winner by Category

Other categories 2019–20
Not held

Other categories 2018–19
 NFSBiH held its own ceremony (fifth annual) to award best football players/or game officials of the season in Bosnian leagues.

Best goalkeeper BiH Futsal team: Stanislav Galić (Mostar SG Staklorad) 
Best player Futsal BiH premier league:  Marijo Aladžić (Mostar SG Staklorad) 
Best woman's goalkeeper of BiH premier league: Elma Kundić (ŽNK Iskra) 
Best woman's player of BiH premier league: Selma Kapetanović (SFK 2000 Sarajevo)
Fair Play Award: FK Krupa
Best local manager: Husref Musemić (FK Sarajevo)
Award for Top goalscorer:  Sulejman Krpić (16 goals for FK Željezničar Sarajevo)
Best goalkeeper of Premier League: Vladan Kovačević (FK Sarajevo) 
Best player of Premier League: Mersudin Ahmetović, (FK Sarajevo)

Other categories 2017–18
 NFSBiH held its own ceremony (fourth annual) to award best football players/or game officials of the season in Bosnian leagues.

Best goalkeeper BiH Futsal team: Stanislav Galić (Mostar SG Staklorad) 
Best player Futsal BiH premier league:  Marijo Aladžić (Mostar SG Staklorad) 
Best woman's goalkeeper of BiH premier league: Almina Hodžić (SFK 2000 Sarajevo) 
Best woman's player of BiH premier league: Valentina Šakotić (Radnik Bumerang)
Fair Play Award: FK Krupa
Best local manager: Blaž Slišković (HŠK Zrinjski Mostar)
Award for Top goalscorer:  Miloš Filipović (16 goals for HŠK Zrinjski Mostar)
Best goalkeeper of Premier League: Kenan Pirić (HŠK Zrinjski Mostar) 
Best player of Premier League: Goran Zakarić, (FK Željezničar Sarajevo)

Other categories 2016–17
 NFSBiH held its own ceremony (third annual) to award best football players/or game officials of the season in Bosnian leagues.

Best goalkeeper BiH Futsal team: Bahrudin Omerbegović (MNK Centar Sarajevo)
Best player Futsal BiH premier league:  Marijo Aladžić (Mostar SG Staklorad) 
Best woman's goalkeeper of BiH premier league: Almina Hodžić (SFK 2000 Sarajevo) 
Best woman's player of BiH premier league: Nikolina Milović (Radnik Bumerang)
Fair Play Award: FK Radnik Bijeljina
Best local manager: Mehmed Janjoš (FK Sarajevo)
Award for Top goalscorer:  Ivan Lendrić (19 goals for FK Željezničar Sarajevo)
Best goalkeeper of Premier League: Kenan Pirić (HŠK Zrinjski Mostar) 
Best player of Premier League: Miroslav Stevanović, (FK Željezničar Sarajevo)

Other categories 2015–16
 NFSBiH held its own ceremony (second annual) to award best football players/or game officials of the season in Bosnian leagues.

Best goalkeeper BiH Futsal team: Bahrudin Omerbegović (MNK Centar Sarajevo) 
Best player Futsal BiH premier league: Srđan Ivanković (Mostar SG Staklorad) 
Best woman's goalkeeper of BiH premier league: Almina Hodžić (SFK 2000 Sarajevo) 
Best woman's player of BiH premier league: Armisa Kuč (SFK 2000 Sarajevo) 
Award for Fair-play: Darko Obradović (BiH premier league referee)
Best local manager: Vinko Marinović (HŠK Zrinjski Mostar)
Award for Top goalscorer:  Leon Benko (17 goals for FK Sarajevo)
Best goalkeeper of Premier League: Goran Karačić (HŠK Zrinjski Mostar) 
Best player of Premier League: Zajko Zeba, (FK Sloboda Tuzla)

Other categories 2014–15
 NFSBiH held its own ceremony (first annual) to award best football players of the season in Bosnian leagues.

Best goalkeeper BiH Futsal team: Bahrudin Omerbegović (MNK Centar Sarajevo) 
Best player Futsal BiH premier league: Anel Radmilović (MNK Centar Sarajevo) 
Best woman's goalkeeper of BiH premier league: Envera Hasanbegović (SFK 2000 Sarajevo) 
Best woman's player of BiH premier league: Armisa Kuč (SFK 2000 Sarajevo) 
Award for Fair-play: Dženis Beganović (FK Željezničar Sarajevo) 
Award for Top goalscorer:  Riad Bajić (15 goals for FK Željezničar Sarajevo)
Best goalkeeper of Premier League: Ratko Dujković (HŠK Zrinjski Mostar) 
Best player of Premier League: Wagner Santos Lago from  Brazil, (NK Široki Brijeg)

Other categories 2013–14
Not held

Other categories 2012–13

Player of the year in the Bosnian League: Saša Kajkut,  Čelik Zenica
Manager of the year: Safet Sušić,  Bosnia and Herzegovina national football team
Manager of the year in the Bosnian League: Amar Osim,  Željezničar Sarajevo
Award for Top goalscorer:  Emir Hadžić (20 goals for FK Sarajevo)
Foreign player of the year in the Bosnian League: Miloš Vidović, from  Serbia, Olimpik Sarajevo
Goalkeeper of the year in the Bosnian League: Dejan Bandović,  FK Sarajevo
Best organized Bosnian club:  NK Široki Brijeg
Referee of the year: Elmir Pilav
U21 player of the year: Sead Kolašinac,  Schalke 04
U19 player of the year: Armin Hodžić,  Željezničar Sarajevo
U17 player of the year: Samir Radovac,  FK Sarajevo
Futsal player of the year: Slaven Novoselac
Female player of the year: Amira Spahić,  2000 Sarajevo
Football worker of the year: Elvedin Begić,  Football Association of Bosnia and Herzegovina
Newcomer of the year: Sead Kolašinac,  Schalke 04
Young player of the year in the Bosnian League: Nermin Zolotić,  Željezničar Sarajevo
Goalkeeper of the year: Asmir Begović,  Stoke City

Other categories 2011–12

Player of the year in the Bosnian League: Zajko Zeba,  Željezničar Sarajevo
Manager of the year: Amar Osim,  Željezničar Sarajevo
Manager of the year in the Bosnian League: Amar Osim,  Željezničar Sarajevo
Award for Top goalscorer:  Eldin Adilović (19 goals for Željezničar Sarajevo)
Foreign player of the year in the Bosnian League: Vedran Ješe, from  Croatia, Široki Brijeg
Goalkeeper of the year in the Bosnian League: Adnan Gušo,  Željezničar Sarajevo
Best organized Bosnian club:  NK Široki Brijeg
Referee of the year: Elmir Pilav
U21 player of the year: Miroslav Stevanović,  FK Vojvodina
U19 player of the year: Nermin Zolotić,  Željezničar Sarajevo
U17 player of the year: Semir Musić,  FK Sloboda Tuzla
Futsal player of the year: Alen Lalić
Female player of the year: Amira Spahić,  2000 Sarajevo
Football worker of the year: Dino Selimović,  FK Sarajevo
Newcomer of the year: Mario Kvesić,  NK Široki Brijeg
Young player of the year in the Bosnian League: Josip Kvesić,  Željezničar Sarajevo
Goalkeeper of the year: Asmir Begović,  Stoke City

Other categories 2010
Player of the year in the Bosnian League: Vule Trivunović,  Borac Banja Luka
Manager of the year: Vahid Halilhodžić,  Dinamo Zagreb
Manager of the year in the Bosnian League: Amar Osim,  Željezničar
Foreign player of the year in the Bosnian League: Wagner Santos Lago, from  Brazil, Široki Brijeg
Goalkeeper of the year in the Bosnian League: Ibrahim Šehić,  Željezničar
Best organized Bosnian club:  Olimpic Sarajevo
Referee of the year: Radosav Vukasović
U21 player of the year: Muhamed Subašić,  Olimpic Sarajevo
U19 player of the year: Amer Bekić,  Sloboda Tuzla
U17 player of the year: Armin Hodžić,  Željezničar
Futsal player of the year: Nijaz Mulahmetović,  Orlić Sarajevo
Female player of the year: Alisa Spahić,  2000 Sarajevo
Football worker of the year:Nijaz Brković,  Željezničar
Newcomer of the year: Muhamed Bešić,  Hamburger SV
Young player of the year in the Bosnian League: Edin Višća,  Željezničar
Goalkeeper of the year: Asmir Begović,  Stoke City

Other categories 2009
Player of the year in the Bosnian League: Amer Osmanagić,  Velež Mostar
Manager of the year: Miroslav Blažević,  Bosnia and Herzegovina
Manager of the year in the Bosnian League: Abdulah Ibraković,  Velež Mostar
Foreign player of the year in the Bosnian League: Juan Manuel Varea, from  Argentina, Široki Brijeg
Goalkeeper of the year in the Bosnian League: Muhamed Alaim,  Sarajevo
Best organized Bosnian club:  Široki Brijeg
Referee of the year: Rusmir Mrković
U21 player of the year: Ermin Zec,  Šibenik
U19 player of the year: Haris Seferovic,  Fiorentina
U17 player of the year: Safet Šivšić,  Dinamo Zagreb
Futsal player of the year: Nijaz Mulahmetović,  Orlić Sarajevo
Female player of the year: Aida Hadžić,  2000 Sarajevo
Football worker of the year: Zlatan Jelić,  Široki Brijeg

Other categories 2008
Player of the year in the Bosnian League: Velibor Đurić,  Zrinjski Mostar
Manager of the year: Mehmed Baždarević,  Grenoble Foot 38
Foreign player of the year in the Bosnian League Darko Spalević, from  Serbia, Slavija
Goalkeeper of the year in the Bosnian League: Denis Mujkić,  Jedinstvo Bihać
Best organized Bosnian club:  Široki Brijeg
Referee of the year: Novo Panić
U21 player of the year: Semir Štilić,  Lech Poznań
U19 player of the year: Haris Handžić,  Sarajevo
U17 player of the year: Dženan Durak,  Freiburg
Futsal player of the year: Alen Lalić,  Potpićan 98
Female player of the year: Lidija Kuliš,  2000 Sarajevo
Football worker of the year Zlatan Jelić,  Široki Brijeg
Fan Group of the year: The Maniacs (Željezničar)

References

Footballers in Bosnia and Herzegovina
Awards established in 2008
2008 establishments in Bosnia and Herzegovina
Bosnia and Herzegovina awards
Annual events in Bosnia and Herzegovina
Association football player non-biographical articles